The Peanut Man is a 1947 American  film about the life of George Washington Carver starring Clarence Muse. Muse won an interracial unity award for his role in the 45-minute film in 1949. In 1954, Jet magazine reported he was working on another Carver film at his Muse-a-White ranch in Perris, California as a test film for a planned feature film. Tony Paton was the producer for the test film.

Paton and Muse met on a flight to New Orleans. Ebony magazine headlined an article about the film stating it "Indicts Hollywood Race Bias". A continuity cutting for the film was deposited with the New York State Archives.

Maidie Norman made her film debut in the film. A poster for the film touts it as the "First Colored Feature Film in Glorious Natural Colors".

Cast
 Clarence Muse as George Washington Carver
 Ernest Anderson as Robert
 Maidie Norman as Lucretia
 Shelby Bacon as Augustus
 Wade Crosby as Jeffries
 Ray Teal as Dr. Miller
 Bernard Gorcey as Murphy

References

1947 films
Biographical films about scientists
American black-and-white films
George Washington Carver
1940s English-language films